Winterset was a small settlement in Winterset Township, Russell County, Kansas, United States.

History
Winterset was issued a post office in 1882. The post office was discontinued in 1890.

References

Former populated places in Russell County, Kansas
Former populated places in Kansas